This is a list of Namibian Twenty20 International cricketers. In April 2018, the ICC decided to grant full Twenty20 International (T20I) status to all its members. Therefore, all Twenty20 matches played between Namibia and other ICC members after 1 January 2019 will have T20I status.

This list comprises all members of the Namibia cricket team who have played at least one T20I match. It is initially arranged in the order in which each player won his first Twenty20 cap. Where more than one player won his first Twenty20 cap in the same match, those players are listed alphabetically by surname. Namibia played their first T20I match on 20 May 2019 against Ghana at the ICC T20 World Cup Africa Qualifier Finals.

Key

List of players
Statistics are correct as of 20 October 2022.

Notes

See also
List of Namibia ODI cricketers

References 

T20I cricketers
Namibia